Heydarabad-e Qur Tapasi (also Romanized as Ḩeydarābād-e Qūr Tapasī; also known as Ḩeydarābād) is a village in Vardasht Rural District, in the Central District of Semirom County, Isfahan Province, Iran. At the 2006 census, its population was 23, in 5 families.

References 

Populated places in Semirom County